Navalgi  is a village in the southern state of Karnataka, India. It is located in the Jamkhandi taluk of Bagalkot district in Karnataka.

Demographics
 India census, Navalgi had a population of 6435 with 3229 males and 3206 females.

See also
 Bagalkot
 Districts of Karnataka

References

External links
 http://Bagalkot.nic.in/

Villages in Bagalkot district